Dara Joseph O'Shea (born 4 March 1999) is an Irish professional footballer who plays as a defender for  club West Bromwich Albion and the Republic of Ireland national team.

Club career
Born in Dublin, O'Shea began his career at St. Kevin's Boys before moving to English club West Bromwich Albion. He spent the 2017–18 season on loan at Hereford. O'Shea was part of the Hereford side that won the Southern League Premier Division, winning promotion to the National League North.

He moved on loan to Exeter City in August 2018. In March 2019, he was praised by Exeter manager Matt Taylor.

O'Shea signed a new three-year contract with West Brom on 24 January 2020. He scored his first league goal on 9 February 2020, in Albion's 2–0 victory over Millwall.

International career
O'Shea has represented the Republic of Ireland at under-19 and under-21 youth levels.

He made his debut for the senior Republic of Ireland national team on 14 October 2020, against Finland. On 1 September 2021, he was named FAI Young Player of the Year for 2020.

Career statistics

International

Honours

Individual
FAI Young Player of the Year: 2020

References

1999 births
Living people
Republic of Ireland association footballers
Republic of Ireland youth international footballers
Republic of Ireland under-21 international footballers
Republic of Ireland international footballers
Association football defenders
St. Kevin's Boys F.C. players
West Bromwich Albion F.C. players
Hereford F.C. players
Exeter City F.C. players
Southern Football League players
English Football League players
Premier League players
Republic of Ireland expatriate association footballers
Expatriate footballers in England
Irish expatriate sportspeople in England